Lyden Nå is the sixth and final full-length studio album from Australian death metal/grindcore band Blood Duster. The title translates to The Now Sound from Norwegian and was given this name in tribute to the early black metal scene. This is a triple album containing two full CDs and a downloadable track. CD one features death rock while the second CD is grindcore, the downloadable track is a 21-minute drone doom piece.

The album includes contributions from numerous guest musicians, the most significant of whom is Darryl Cotton. Other guests include Pod People guitarist and former Blood Duster member Josh Nixon, Rob Mollica of the Melbourne death metal band Earth, Jay Jones of Fuck...I'm Dead, S.S. Carrotman of Baron Haze and Craig Westwood of Dernrutlidge and Christbait. Westwood provides lead vocals on the track "The Night They Burned Ol' Emo Down".

Lyden Nå debuted in the Australia independent music album chart at #9.  Drummer Matt Rizzo was dismissed from the group in September 2007 before their tour with Napalm Death, and replaced by Dave Healey. Rizzo returned in 2015.  A promotional video was made for the track "PissStomper".

In May 2008, the album was released on vinyl in Germany as a double album, with the rock album on the first record, the grindcore album on side A of the second record and the drone track, "Slow and Long in A", on the B-side. The side names on the vinyl spell out "CUNT".

Track listing

CD 1 (The Rock Album / Sides C and U):

Intro - 00:51
Three Oh Seven Ohh (Fuller) - 2:09
Piss Stomper (Fuller/Collins) - 1:51
The Kids Can Get Fucked (Fuller) - 2:13
Rock N Roll Jihad (Fuller) - 1:55
Broke Ass Bitch (Fuller/Beltsy/Forde) - 3:18
MySpace Your Face (Beltsy/Collins/Fuller) - 2:37
Angry Dragon (Fuller) - 1:28
I Love the Pills (Fuller) - 2:32
Duster Duster (Fuller/Collins) - 3:17
The Night They Burned Ol' Emo Down (Fuller) - 5:10

CD 2 (The Grind Album / Side N):

Tendons Sliced for Transport (Fuller) - 1:29
The Rich Breed Fucking Cockhead Children Who Will One Day be Your Employer (Beltsy/Fuller) - 0:24
The World and Everyone In It Deserves to Die (Beltsy/Fuller) - 0:24
Recreational Killing (Beltsy/Fuller) - 1:14
Better Start a Seed Bank (Beltsy/Fuller) - 1:09
Child Labour Economics (Fuller/Beltsy) - 1:06
Barrel Chock Full of Dead Cops (Beltsy/Fuller) - 0:49
Czech It Out I Got Some Rules (Collins/Fuller) - 0:15
LustMord (Beltsy/Fuller) - 1:39
Oh My Myra Hindley (Fuller) - 0:34
E55 (Collins/Fuller) - 0:10
Raped With a Tyre Iron (Collins/Fuller) - 1:28
I Saw Your Dad Sucking Off Another Dude's Dad (Fuller) - 0:38
Organs For a Profit (Beltsy/Fuller) - 0:58
Strung Up With Cock in Hand (Fuller) - 0:58
Ballad of Henry and Otis (Beltsy/Fuller) - 3:20

CD 3 (The Third Album / Side T):

Slow and Long in A (Fuller) - 21:13

Credits
Jason Fuller - bass (CD 1, track 11)
Matt Rizzo - drums, vocals (CD 1)
Matt Collins - guitar, vocals (CD 1)
Scott Pritchard - guitar, vocals CD 1)
Tony Forde - vocals

Guests:

Darryl Cotton (spoken voice, track 9, CD 1)
Jay Jones - vocals (track 13, CD 2)
Craig Westwood - acoustic guitar, vocals, track 11, CD 1)
Mark Saul - bagpipes
Josh O'Dea - piano
Josh Nixon - backing vocals
Rob Mollica - backing vocals
S.S. Carrotman - backing vocals

2007 albums
Blood Duster albums